Femi Odugbemi (born 1963) is a writer, filmmaker, television producer, and founder/executive Producer of Zuri24 Media, a content production company in Lagos.

Early life and career 
Odugbemi was born in Lagos State, southwestern Nigeria in 1963. He studied film and television production at Montana State University Bozeman Montana, USA (1979-1984). After graduating, he worked briefly at the Nigerian Television Authority and later as a film and radio producer at 2 advertising agencies in Lagos - LOWE-LINTAS and McCann-Erickson.

In 2008, he produced Tinsel a Nigerian soap opera that began airing in August 2008 and was acclaimed as "the most successful television drama on Nigerian television in recent times" in 2013. Odugbemi scripted, directed and produced Bariga Boys, a Nigerian documentary about street performers in Bariga, Lagos State.

In 2008, he produced Abobaku, a short film directed by Niji Akanni, and won the Most Outstanding Short Film at the Zuma Film Festival held in 2010 and Best Costume at the 6th Africa Movie Academy Awards, held in April 2010 at the Gloryland Cultural Center in Yenagoa, Bayelsa State, Nigeria.

He is a voting member of the Academy of Motion Picture Arts and Sciences(Oscars) and also a voting member of the Academy of Television Arts and Sciences (Emmys). He is one of the few filmmakers in the continent who is elected to both the Film and TV international academies.

Femi has brought to screen some of Sub-Saharan Africa’s television drama series. He was the founding Content producer of TINSEL in 2008. The soap opera was Nigeria’s first studio multi-camera daily series and is also now one of the longest-running ever with over 0ver 3,500 episodes and counting. He also produced the popular telenovela BATTLEGROUND(2018). Other drama series produced by Odugbemi include the crime series BRETHREN(2019), and the migration story MOVEMENT JAPA(2020) and his more recent work, the political drama series COVENANT(2022/23).

He has produced and directed feature films including MAROKO (2006), GIDI BLUES (2016), 4th Estate (2017), and Code Wilo (2018).

The documentaries he wrote and produced include ‘OUI VOODOO’ (2005), ‘IBADAN: Cradle of Literati’ (2006) ‘METAMORPHOSIS’ (2006), ‘ORIKI’ (2008) ‘BARIGA BOY’ (2009) ‘AND THE CHAIN WAS NOT’ (2010), In 2013, he scripted, produced, and directed a documentary titled, FAGUNWA: Literature, Language and Literalism about the late Nigerian writer, Daniel O. Fagunwa, the author of Ògbójú Ọdẹ nínú Igbó Irúnmalẹ̀.  ‘MAKOKO: Futures Afloat’, (2016) and the recent ‘UNMASKED: Leadership, Trust and the COVID-19 Pandemic in Nigeria. (2021).

He is a former President of the Independent Producers Association of Nigeria (ITPAN)(2002-2006)
He served as a four-time Head Judge of the Africa Magic Viewer’s Choice Awards (AMVCA), 3 times Head Jury of the Uganda Film Festival, Juror of the Johannesburg International Film Festival South Africa, and a Juror/Mentor of the NETFLIX/UNESCO African Folktales Reimagined project. 
Deeply passionate about impacting the younger generation of African storytellers, Femi facilitates training and film courses in various tertiary institutions across the continent. He was the pioneer Academy Director of the Multichoice Talent Factory West Africa(2018-2022) and he currently facilitates trains and workshops at institutions across the continent.
He is a Co-founder/Director of the iRepresent International Documentary Film Festival. The Festival has pursued its theme of “Africa in self-conversation” by championing films and stories from Africa, about Africa, and by Africans.

He is a receipient of the Film Excellence Award of the Society of the Performing Arts of Nigeria(November 2013). He also received in 2018 the Lifetime Achievement Award from the Nigerian Film Corporation.

See also 
 List of Nigerian film producers

References

External links 
 Zuri24 Media
 

Nigerian film directors
Nigerian film producers
Nigerian screenwriters
Nigerian dramatists and playwrights
Living people
Yoruba filmmakers
Yoruba-language film directors
People from Lagos State
Montana State University alumni
English-language film directors
Filmmakers from Lagos
1963 births
Nigerian cinematographers
Nigerian photographers
Nigerian documentary filmmakers